A tightwad may refer to a miser but may also refer to:
 Tightwad Hill, California
 Tightwad, Missouri